Gaienhofen is a municipality in the district of Konstanz in Baden-Württemberg in Germany. It is located at the border with Switzerland.

Since 1974, Gaienhofen consists of four villages: Gaienhofen, Gundholzen, Hemmenhofen and Horn.  Attractions, apart from the Lake of Constance, include the Hermann-Hesse-Höri-Museum and the Museum Haus Dix.

World heritage site
It is home to one or more prehistoric pile-dwelling (or stilt house) settlements that are part of the Prehistoric Pile dwellings around the Alps UNESCO World Heritage Site.

Twin towns
Gaienhofen is twinned with:

  Saint-Georges-de-Didonne, France
  Balatonföldvár, Hungary

See also
Erich Heckel
Hermann Hesse

Gallery

References

External links

  
 Otto-Dix-Haus
 Hermann-Hesse-Höri-Museum
 Hermann-Hesse-Haus

Konstanz (district)